Gustavo Saibt Martins (born 20 July 1979), known as Gustavo Papa or simply Gustavo, is a Brazilian football manager and former player who played as a striker. He is the current assistant manager of Caxias.

Playing career
Gustavo played for Juventude, Internacional and São Caetano in the Campeonato Brasileiro Série A. He also played for Wuhan Guanggu in the Chinese first division.

Honours
Coritiba
Campeonato Brasileiro Série B: 2007

Brasil de Pelotas
Campeonato Gaúcho Second Division: 2013

References

1979 births
Living people
Sportspeople from Rio Grande do Sul
Brazilian footballers
Brazilian football managers
Association football forwards
Brazilian expatriate footballers
Expatriate footballers in China
Brazilian expatriate sportspeople in China
Expatriate footballers in Sweden
Campeonato Brasileiro Série A players
Campeonato Brasileiro Série B players
Campeonato Brasileiro Série C players
Campeonato Brasileiro Série D players
Allsvenskan players
Superettan players
Chinese Super League players
Grêmio Foot-Ball Porto Alegrense players 
Esporte Clube São Luiz players
Esporte Clube Internacional players
Grêmio Esportivo Bagé players 
São Gabriel Futebol Clube players
Landskrona BoIS players
Esporte Clube Juventude players
Canoas Sport Club players
Grêmio Esportivo Glória players 
Sport Club Internacional players
Associação Desportiva São Caetano players
Coritiba Foot Ball Club players
Wuhan Guanggu players
Brasiliense Futebol Clube players
Esporte Clube Novo Hamburgo players
Associação Chapecoense de Futebol players
Fortaleza Esporte Clube players
Associação Atlética Anapolina players
Grêmio Esportivo Brasil players
Grêmio Esportivo Brasil managers
Clube Esportivo Bento Gonçalves managers